The 2017 Texas A&M Aggies baseball team represents the Texas A&M University in the 2017 NCAA Division I baseball season. The Aggies play their home games at Olsen Field at Blue Bell Park.

The Aggies reached the College World Series for the sixth time in school history.

Personnel

Roster

Coaching staff

Schedule and results

Record vs. conference opponents

References

Texas AandM
Texas A&M Aggies baseball seasons
Texas AandM
College World Series seasons